Ludovic de Contenson (born 28 February 1861 in Lyon – died 1935) was a French geographer and historian.

References

1861 births
1935 deaths
20th-century French historians
Montyon Prize laureates
19th-century French historians